Harry Cavanough (1898–1966) was an Australian rugby league footballer who played in the 1920s. He was a multi premiership winner with South Sydney Rabbitohs and he also played for Newtown in the NSWRL competition.

Playing career
Cavanough made his first grade debut for Newtown in 1921 against Balmain.  Cavanough's time at Newtown was not a successful one as the club spent most of the time near the bottom of the ladder.  

In 1925, Cavanough joined South Sydney and in 1926 was a member of the premiership winning team defeating University in the grand final.  Cavanough went on to win two further premierships with Souths in consecutive years against St George and arch rivals Eastern Suburbs as the club went through a golden era in the 1920s winning a total of 5 premierships.  

Cavanough retired at the end of the 1928 season.  He also represented New South Wales on 23 occasions between 1926 and 1928.

Harry Cavanough died on 10 Jan 1966.

References

South Sydney Rabbitohs players
Australian rugby league players
New South Wales rugby league team players
1898 births
1966 deaths
Rugby league second-rows
Rugby league locks
Newtown Jets players